The World Sambo Championships are the main championships in Sambo and Combat Sambo, organized by the Fédération Internationale de Sambo (FIAS).

History
The first World Sambo Cup took place in 1977 in Oviedo, Spain. Two years later, the first Youth World Championships were held in Madrid, Spain.

In 1984, an assembly of the Fédération Internationale des Luttes Associées (FILA), now known as the United World Wrestling, chose to create an independent federation for sambo, the Fédération Internationale de Sambo (FIAS). On 13 June 1984, a constitutive General Assembly of the FIAS was held in Madrid, in which delegates from 56 countries took part. Fernando Compte was elected the first president of FIAS.

The first championships for women was held in 1983 in Madrid, Spain.

Timeline
The International Association of the public union the “European Sambo Federation” was established in 1991 and officially registered in 2005. The European sambo federation (ESF) is a member of International Sambo Federation (FIAS).

In 2007 SAMBO was presented at the First European Games in Ukraine.

In 2010 SAMBO was included in the SportAccord World Combat Games which were held in Beijing (China).

In 2012 the European SAMBO championship among cadets (15-16 years, boys and girls) was organised for the first time in Tallinn.

In 2013 SAMBO was included in the official program of the 27th Summer Universiade, the World Students Games in Kazan (Russia) and also into the Asian Games.

In 2014 SAMBO was included into the program of the European Games.

In 2007 SAMBO was presented at the First European Games in Ukraine.

In 2010 SAMBO was included in the SportAccord World Combat Games which were held in Beijing (China).

In 2012 the European SAMBO championship among cadets (15-16 years, boys and girls) was organised for the first time in Tallinn.

In 2013 SAMBO was included in the official program of the 27th Summer Universiade, the World Students Games in Kazan (Russia) and also into the Asian Games.

In 2014 SAMBO was included into the program of the European Games.

In 2015 First European Games were held in Baku, Azerbaijan. The same year European SAMBO Cup was included in the ESF Calendar.

In 2016 First World University SAMBO Championships under the banner of FISU was held in Nicosia, Cyprus.

2017 - World SAMBO Championships were held in Sochi, Russia. A record number of 490 athletes from 90 countries were competing for the titles of World Champions.

In 2018 Orel (Russia) hosted for the first time the World Schools SAMBO Championships under the auspices of the International School Sports Federation (ISF). Athletes from 21 countries took part in the competition.

2019 - II European Games were held in Minsk.

Azerbaijan, Belarus, Bulgaria, Cyprus, Greece, Georgia, Italy, Moldova, Latvia, Lithuania, Russia, Spain, Montenegro and Serbia hosted many sambo championships during these years.

In 2012 at the report-electing congress of the European sambo federation Dr. Sergey Eliseev, the president of the All-Russian Sambo Federation, was re-elected for the position of the ESF president for the next period.

Events 
1996 to 2020 weight classes:

Since 2021 reduce to 7 weight.

Senior Championships 
Women's World Championships was held for the first time in 1984. In 1993 FIAS splits into 2 organisations FIAS East (Russian control) and FIAS West (USA and Western European control) until 2005. In 2005 FILA reaches an agreement with FIAS West and re-assumes sanctioning over SAMBO but in 2008 FILA again discontinues sanctioning sambo. In 2014 FIAS and FILA sign a cooperative agreement:

Note: C = Combat Sambo / S = Sport Sambo / W = Women Events

Other championships

Juniors 
Since 1979:

Younth 
Since 1996:

Cadet 
Unknown.

Masters 
Unknown.

Students / University 
Since 2003:

2016 – 1st WORLD UNIVERSITY SAMBO CHAMPIONSHIPS (M&W, TEAMS)

Schools 
Since 2018:

 Inaugural World Schools Championships in 2018.

Deaf 
Since 2017.

First international deaf Sambo tournament held in 2017 but is not world championship.

Beach 
Since 2021.

Military 
Since 2018.

See also 
 Sambo World Cup
 European Sambo Championships
 Sambo at the 2015 European Games
 Sambo at the 2019 European Games
 Sambo at the 2018 Asian Games
 Sambo at the Summer Universiade
 Sambo at the World Games

References

External links 
 Ukrainian Sambo Federation: History of sambo
 European Sambo Federation
 http://vsambo.ru/chempionat-mira/
 https://sambo.sport/en/fias/about/
 https://sambo.sport/en/fias/history/
 https://www.insidethegames.biz/timelines/10
 https://web.archive.org/web/20170809090446/http://www.sambo.com/history-videos.html
 https://web.archive.org/web/20170809085945/http://www.sambo.com/archiv.html
 https://web.archive.org/web/20170809090301/http://www.sambo.com/results.html
 https://web.archive.org/web/20170809085935/http://www.sambo.com/2012-06-20-en.html
 https://sambo.sport/en/events/
 http://vsambo.ru/sorevnovaniya/
 http://vsambo.ru/yuniory/
 http://sambo.net.ua/?code=19_1
 http://sambo.net.ua/?code=19_2&id=71
 http://sambo.net.ua/?code=19_2&id=127
 http://sambo.net.ua/?code=19_2&id=78
 http://sambo.net.ua/
 https://crgazette.newspaperarchive.com/cedar-rapids-gazette/1984-12-21/page-20/
 https://www.milsport.one/news/1118-november-2018/cism-signs-mou-with-international-sambo-federation
 https://sambo.sport/en/news/v-indonezii-razygryvayutsya-medali-chempionata-yugo-vostochnoy-azii-po-sambo/
 http://www.eurosambo.com/en/competitions/
 http://www.eurosambo.com/en/competitions/2014/151/
 http://www.eurosambo.com/
 http://www.eurosambo.com/en/
 https://web.archive.org/web/2019*/http://sambo-asia.org/en/
 https://web.archive.org/web/*/http://www.sambo.asia/
 https://web.archive.org/web/20171022024949/http://sambounion.asia/en/post/sambo/history
 https://sambo.sport/en/federations/
 https://olympic.kz/en/article/7492-predstavlen-logotip-chempionata-mira-po-sambo-2019

 
Sambo (martial art) competitions
Sambo